Brian Roberts is a former football (soccer) player who represented New Zealand at international level.

Roberts played two official A-international matches for the New Zealand in 1991, both against trans-Tasman rivals Australia, the first as a substitute in a 0–1 loss on 12 May. He started the match for his second and final appearance and scored New Zealand's goal in a 1–2 loss on 12 May 1991.

References 

Year of birth missing (living people)
Living people
New Zealand association footballers
New Zealand international footballers
Association footballers not categorized by position